Mark Bernstein may refer to:

 Mark Bernstein (University of Michigan), American politician, regent and member of the University of Michigan Board of Regents
 Detention of Mark Bernstein (born 1965), Wikipedia editor based in Belarus
 Mark H. Bernstein (born 1948), American philosopher